Liars is an Australian-American experimental rock band formed in Brooklyn, New York, in 2000. Angus Andrew is the founding and only constant member of Liars, currently joined by multi-instrumentalist Cameron Deyell and drummer Laurence Pike. Aaron Hemphill played with the band from its inception until his amicable departure from the project in 2017. Julian Gross joined the band for their second album They Were Wrong, So We Drowned in 2004, and played with the band until his departure in 2014. Liars have released ten studio albums and are signed to Mute Records. They combine elements of punk-rock with electronica, with Andrew inspired by artists such as Orchestral Manoeuvres in the Dark (OMD), The Cure, PJ Harvey, Underworld, The Doors and Michael Franks.

History

Formative years

The genesis of the band can be traced to Los Angeles, where Andrew and Gross were enrolled at Cal Arts, studying in the Photography Program. Hemphill had studied microbiology in Junior College in San Diego, but was then employed in LA at a record store. Upon meeting, Andrew and Hemphill began their collaboration on four-track recordings. Once Andrew had completed art school, they relocated to New York City together. After responding to an ad, Pat Noecker (bass, formerly of Neuromancer, Urethra Franklin, and Opium Taylor) and Ron Albertson (drums, formerly of Mercy Rule) joined to become the band's rhythm section.

They Threw Us All in a Trench and Stuck a Monument on Top (2001–2002)

Liars' debut album They Threw Us All in a Trench and Stuck a Monument on Top was released on 30 October 2001. Recorded in a mere two days with producer Steve Revitte, the album bore resemblance to the work of Delta 5 and Gang of Four, accenting their angular, acerbic punk with modern synths and drum machines. The album generated interest in the band and gained them a following amongst the post-punk revival scene of New York. It was during this time they were interviewed and filmed in performance for the documentary Kill Your Idols, along with bands like Yeah Yeah Yeahs and Black Dice. Liars were not averse to this attention, but the problem of being pigeon-holed became a pressing challenge for the band to overcome.

As a four-piece, Liars were only to release two more short EPs. The first was entitled We No Longer Knew Who We Were; it was an official release of the band's early demos recorded in 2000. The second, however, showcased new material. Fins to Make Us More Fish-Like (November 2002) showed progression from their signature sound, but without any material that would seem significantly out of place on their debut. Most noteworthy, perhaps, is "Every Day Is a Child with Teeth", which concentrates more on sound texture and tense, stuttering percussion than the more danceable rhythms for which they had come to be known.

Line-up changes

Due to differences of creative methods, it was agreed that Noecker and Albertson would leave the band to pursue other work. Both joined the short-lived band No Things. Noecker would later pop up in the band These Are Powers. Meanwhile, Andrew and Hemphill reunited with Gross to form the next incarnation of Liars. The first release from Liars as a three-piece was a split EP with the band Oneida, called Atheists, Reconsider (released December 2002 by the Arena Rock Recording Co.). Liars contributed a cover of Oneida's "Rose and Licorice," as well as two originals. "Dorothy Taps the Foot of the Tinman" is a 7+ minute sound collage of kitchen-sink percussion, ambient drones and static, and copy/paste spoken words.

Witch hunting
This newfound experimentation paved the way for Liars' next full-length album, They Were Wrong, So We Drowned (recorded in March and May 2003, released February 2004). The band relocated to a cabin in the woods of New Jersey for the recording sessions, and along with producer David Andrew Sitek of TV on the Radio immersed themselves in both non-fiction accounts of witch trials and traditional witch folklore. From these sources, Andrew created a generic fairy tale which is told through contrasting viewpoints in the lyrics. This commitment to the material at the heart of the album—a "story album" (as opposed to "concept album"), according to Andrew—resulted in a thematically rich piece of work that can often feel more atmospheric than musical. The non-traditional instrumentation and song structuring furthers its feel of concept over musicality, along with Sitek's signature harmonies and sound looping. Many critics responded negatively to this aspect of the album, and though it had its fervent supporters, it infamously garnered the lowest possible scores from both Spin and Rolling Stone magazines.

Berlin days

Creatively unfazed by the critical response to their unexpected experimental leap, the band relocated once again to Berlin where they would eventually record their third full-length, Drum's Not Dead (recorded in 2004, released February 2006). During the interim between the recording and release of their previous album, Liars had already begun the work on what would eventually become Drum's Not Dead. Liars began experimenting with modified drum sounds. After much experimentation (and reportedly an entire album's worth of material cast aside), the group completed the album in an East German broadcast center that allowed them a multitude of different acoustic environments for recording. As the title suggests, the album is heavy on drums (often run through various effects pedals), backed mostly by atmospheric guitar work. Andrew also relies more heavily on falsetto than in past work, which gives the album a more ethereal, less gritty sound than is often associated with Liars. Along with the music, Drum's Not Dead was released with a DVD that contains three full-length video companions to the album: Drum's Not Bread by Julian Gross, The Helix Aspersa by Angus Andrew, and By Your Side by filmmaker Markus Wambsganss.

The rhythmic electroacoustic experimentalism was not only used in the studio set up, but continued in their live performances during the Drum's Not Dead tour. Microphones taped on Gross drum kit and the percussion set of Hemphill picked up the live played rhythms and were modulated heavily by digital real-time processing spring reverbs and pitch shifters forming multi layered drones. The creation of this set-up is outlined in the CD booklet for Drum's Not Dead.

Liars
The band officially announced their album Liars on May 24, 2007. It was released August 28, 2007 on Mute Records. In support of the album, Liars toured the UK over August 2007, North America over September/October 2007 supporting Interpol, Europe over November/December 2007, North America over January/February 2008 with No Age and May 2008 with Radiohead. The band also participated on Vincent Moon's The Take-Away Shows.

Sisterworld
On November 2, 2009, Pitchfork reported that Liars had updated their MySpace page by posting links to the website www.thesisterworld.com. Upon clicking the door displayed on the website, three short clips are shown, all three of natural landscapes with amplified ambient sounds. However, when the word "SISTERWORLD" below the door is clicked, the viewer is taken to the Liars' merchandise page.

On November 4 the band confirmed that Sisterworld would be the new album, and would be released in early 2010 on Mute Records. According to the Pitchfork article, It was written and recorded in Los Angeles with Jon Brion collaborator Tom Biller and much inspired by the city. The band had this to say of the record: 

In addition to this, the press release states:  The album was released on CD and Vinyl on Tuesday, March 9, 2010.

During this time, San Francisco-based artist, musician, and Red Bull enthusiast Jesse Jackson (of Flaspar and Sissy Spacek) joined the band on tour to play auxiliary guitar.

Liars are featured on the latest Beck 'Record Club' in which they covered the INXS album Kick. Angus from the band suggested that they cover this LP.

The band were chosen by Portishead to perform at the ATP I'll Be Your Mirror festival that they curated in July 2011 at London's Alexandra Palace.

WIXIW
The band released their sixth album entitled 'WIXIW (pronounced 'wish you') on June 4, 2012. The first single from the album, No. 1 Against the Rush, was released on 28 May 2012. It was written in an isolated cabin north of Los Angeles with the aim of removing themselves from the influence of "extraneous things". It was recorded in the industrial area of LA, in an unused office block.

Regarding the album's title, the band commented:

Mess
On January 13, 2014, Liars premiered their single "Mess on a Mission" and announced the title of their 7th album as Mess, which was released on March 24 via Mute Records.

TFCF 
On February 20, 2017, Liars updated their site with a short video clip titled TFCF. Another video was later added, called TFCF H, and then TFCF E, and so on. When taking the last letter of each of these videos, the word THEME is spelled out. On June 2, the band released four more videos which spell out the word FROM. On June 15 and June 24, more videos were released spelling the words CRYING and FOUNTAIN, respectively. On May 18, Andrew announced a new Liars album to be released sometime in August, along with the amicable departure of founding member Aaron Hemphill. He will go on tour from August with a new backup band.

The initialism TFCF was the title of the band's LP which was released on August 25, 2017. Liars have, as a matter of course, sounded radically different with each album, pursuing new concepts and occupying diverse mindsets. On this, Liars’ eighth studio album, the bustling backdrops of Los Angeles, Berlin and New York have been replaced with a presence far more intimate and autobiographical.

The Apple Drop 
On May 4, 2021, Liars announced the release of a new album, titled The Apple Drop, which was released on August 6.

Discography

Albums

Notes

Awards and nominations

ARIA Music Awards
The ARIA Music Awards is an annual awards ceremony that recognises excellence, innovation, and achievement across all genres of Australian music. They commenced in 1987. 

! 
|-
| 2018
| 1/1 (Original Soundtrack)
| Best Original Soundtrack, Cast or Show Album
| 
| 
|-

References

External links

 
mute.com Label artist profile

Dance-punk musical groups
Arena Rock Recording Company artists
American art rock groups
American noise rock music groups
Musical groups established in 2000
Post-punk revival music groups
American experimental musical groups
Blast First artists
Mute Records artists